Malaysian Idol 2 is the self-titled compilation released by the finalists of Malaysian Idol 2.

Track listing
"Setulus Cintamu" by Adam
"Mata" by Nita
"Nilai Cintamu" by Azam
"Kau Dan Aku" by Trish
"Menaruh Harapan" by Atilia
"Jika Kau Bercinta Lagi" by Daniel
"Kau Kunci Cintaku Dalam Hatimu" by Xerra
"Seribu Impian" by Ash
"Semakin Rindu Semakin Sayang" by Farah
"Bintang Hati" by Ejay
"Nur Nilam Sari" by Faizull

References 

2005 compilation albums
Compilation albums by Malaysian artists
Malay-language compilation albums
Pop albums by Malaysian artists